Lamb and Flag or Lamb & Flag may refer to:

The insignia of the Middle Temple
A religious pub name
Lamb & Flag (Oxford) – a pub in Oxford
Lamb and Flag, Covent Garden – a pub in Covent Garden, London

See also
Lamb of God